Paul Sutton (born 18 January 1973) is an Australian former professional rugby league footballer who played in the 1990s for the South Sydney Rabbitohs.

Playing career
In 1996, Sutton played for the Toowoomba Clydesdales in the inaugural season of the Queensland Cup, coming off the bench in their Grand Final win over the Redcliffe Dolphins.

In 1997, he moved to the South Sydney Rabbitohs, making his first grade debut in their Round 1 loss to the Illawarra Steelers. In Round 12 of the 1997 ARL season, he scored his first try in a 28–all draw with the Steelers.

References

1973 births
Living people
Australian rugby league players
South Sydney Rabbitohs players
Toowoomba Clydesdales players
Rugby league locks
Rugby league second-rows